Lonely Street is a 2008 American comedy-thriller film directed by Peter Ettinger and starring Jay Mohr, Robert Patrick, Nikki Cox, Joe Mantegna and Katt Williams. The film is based on the novel of the same name by Steve Brewer.

The film premiered at the 2008 Boston Film Festival.

Plot summary
Bubba Mabry (Mohr), a notoriously gullible private detective, is hired to snoop on a tabloid reporter by a mysterious celebrity known only as Mr. Aaron (Patrick). When the tabloid reporter is murdered, Mabry becomes the prime suspect in his death.

Cast
Jay Mohr as Bubba Mabry 
Robert Patrick as Mr. Aaron 
Nikki Cox as Bambi 
Joe Mantegna as Jerry Finkelman 
Katt Williams as Rodent 
Ernie Hudson as Capt. Morgan 
Ken Davitian as Motel Owner 
Lindsay Price as Felicia 
Mike Starr as JG 
Ellen Albertini Dow as Lydia - Librarian 
Paul Rodriguez as Det. Romero 
Gerry Bednob as Bongo 
Heather Wahlquist as Kathy Grabow 
David Mattey as Snake 
Kevin Chapman as Cowboy Cop 
Perry Anzilotti as Marty Grabow 
John F. O'Donohue as Hank 'The Tank' Tankersley 
Marnie Alexenburg as Bartender
Lacey Eberl as Pop Star

Soundtrack
Elvis impersonator James "The King" Brown was brought to Ardent Studios by soundtrack producer Danny Seraphine to record When the Rebel Comes Home and Waiting for this Moment.

References

External links
  
 
 
 

2008 films
2000s police comedy films
American detective films
2008 comedy films
2000s English-language films
2000s American films